Chinese Artists Association of Hong Kong is a non-profit association of Cantonese opera groups and artists in Hong Kong, established in the 1880s. 

In 1953, it registered as an organization in Hong Kong. It is a professional organisation for Cantonese opera performers.

It presented the Cantonese Opera Young Talent Showcase in Hong Kong from 2012 to 2015.

Chairmen
(1953):  Sun Ma Sze Tsang
(1955): Kwan Tak-hing
(1961): Ho Fei-faan
(1964): Mak Bing-wing
(1965-1970): Leung Sing-Bor
(1992-1996): Liza Wang
(1997-2007): Chan Kim Sing
(2007–present): Liza Wang

References

Arts in Hong Kong
Non-profit organisations based in Hong Kong
Arts organizations established in 1953
1953 establishments in Hong Kong